WCPC (940 AM) is a radio station  broadcasting a Christian radio format. Licensed to Houston, Mississippi, United States, the station serves the Tupelo area.  The station is currently owned by Cajun Radio Corporation and features programming from Salem Communications.

Among the locally produced programs on WCPC is "The Sacred Harp Hour", a half-hour Sunday morning broadcast of Sacred Harp singing.  Since 1959, this program has featured recorded (occasionally live) singing, along with announcements of current and upcoming singings.  A CD of some of these performances was issued in 2006.

References

External links

CPC